Hyaloraphidium is a genus of chytrid-like fungi. It is the only member of the family Hyaloraphidiaceae, order Hyaloraphidiales and class Hyaloraphidiomycetes in the division Monoblepharomycota.

The genus has almost cosmopolitan distribution.

Species:

Hyaloraphidium contortum 
Hyaloraphidium curvatum

References

Chytridiomycota
Chytridiomycota genera